Marla De Castro Rausch is the founder and CEO of Animation Vertigo, a motion-capture animation company.

Early life and education
Rausch was raised in the Philippines and earned her bachelor's degree in mass communications from the University of the Philippines. She migrated to the US in 1999.

Career
Rausch worked freelance for her husband's former animation company L.A. Spectrum Studios and also Sony Computer Entertainment America as a motion capture tracker. Throughout the 1990s, she worked as a visa officer for the Canadian and Australian Embassies in the Philippines. Rausch began her work in the US as a financial advisor with Ameriprise Financial and American Express Financial Advisors.

In 2004, she founded Animation Vertigo, a motion-capture animation company. The company maintains offices in San Francisco and Manila with its headquarters in Irvine, California. In 2015, it had 55 employees. Animation Vertigo processes motion-capture studios' raw data before animators receive it. Roughly 85 percent of Animation Vertigo's work involves video games and the rest is done for TV shows and movies. The company's clients include Activision, Madden NFL, FIFA, the Call of Duty franchise and Jim Carrey’s A Christmas Carol.

Personal life
Rausch and her family reside in California. She is a member of the Motion Capture Society, Women in Animation and the International Game Developers Association and is involved in organizations that support entrepreneurial spirit and STEAM to mentor females.

References

External links
Animation Vertigo
Female Entrepreneures Profile

Living people
American animated film producers
21st-century American businesspeople
University of the Philippines alumni
Video game developers
Women video game developers
Year of birth missing (living people)
21st-century American businesswomen